is a railway station on the Kagoshima Main Line, operated by JR Kyushu in Kurume, Fukuoka Prefecture, Japan.

Lines 
Local and rapid services on the line stop at the station.

Layout 
The station consists of two island platforms serving four tracks at grade. A passing loop (track 5) runs to the east of platform/track 4. Further east are numerous sidings. Beyond them are the elevated tracks of the Kyushu Shinkansen which does not have a station here. The station building is a modern concrete block structure with a circular skylight. It houses a staffed ticket window and a narrow waiting area. Access to the island platforms is by means of a footbridge.

Management of the station has been outsourced to the JR Kyushu Tetsudou Eigyou Co., a wholly owned subsidiary of JR Kyushu specialising in station services. It staffs the ticket counter which is equipped with a Midori no Madoguchi facility.

Adjacent stations

History
The station was opened by Japanese Government Railways (JGR) on 20 April 1910 as an additional station on the existing Kagoshima Main Line track. With the privatization of Japanese National Railways (JNR), the successor of JGR, on 1 April 1987, JR Kyushu took over control of the station.

Passenger statistics
In fiscal 2016, the station was used by an average of 1,393 passengers daily (boarding passengers only), and it ranked 126th among the busiest stations of JR Kyushu.

References

External links
Araki Station (JR Kyushu)

Railway stations in Fukuoka Prefecture
Railway stations in Japan opened in 1910